Abt Ur Luv was a weekly, youth-oriented program broadcast on ABS-CBN. The series began airing from November 25, 2006 to January 5, 2008.

Season 1

Cast and characters

Shaina Magdayao as Neri
Rayver Cruz as Gens 
Denise Laurel as Celine
Lauren Young as Nelle 
AJ Perez as Josh
Empress Schuck as Hillary
Carla Humphries as Brenda
Valeen Montenegro as Gwen
Victor Basa as Stick
Enchong Dee as Blue 
Aldred Gatchalian as Lieu
Mikki Arceo as Mitch
Joaquin Mendoza as Vince
Mikee Lee as Mao
Dino Imperial as Bill
Angelo Patrimonio as Webb
Chris Gutierrez as Rickson
 Aaron Agassi as Ahmad
Zia Marquez as Giselle
Isabel Blaesi as Lisa
Peewee OHara as Yaya Ciana
Guest starring:
Sandara Park as Betina
Bob Dela Cruz as Robert
Jenny Suico as Perla
Marissa Sanchez as Tita Linda
John Arcilla as Ramon
Gigi Locsin as Tiya Oleng
Nanding Josef as Erico

Season 2: Abt Ur Luv: Ur Lyf 2

Recurring cast
Carla Humphries as Brenda
Victor Basa as Stick
Lauren Young as Nelle
AJ Perez† as Josh Smith
Empress Schuck as Hillary Smith
Dino Imperial as Bill
Enchong Dee as Blue
Mikee Lee as Mao
Aicelle Santos as Aicelle Anne
Isabel Blaesi as Lisa
Zia Marquez as Giselle
Chris Gutierrez as Rickson
Angelo Patrimonio as Webb
Aldred Gatchalian as Lieu
Valeen Montenegro as Gwen

Additional cast
Krista Valle as Jo
Daphne Cortes as Monique
Jessy Mendiola as Lheny
Caroline Riggs as Arnie
Arno Morales as Prince
Martin del Rosario as Ray
Bryan Homecillo as Junaps
Megan Young as Honey
Alfonso Martinez as Daniel
Gloria Romero as Lola Krissy
Dianne Medina as Joy
Geoff Eigenmann as himself
Chokoleit as donator
Joross Gamboa as thief
Carlo Guevarra as Julio
Isabelle Abiera as Fiona
Erich Gonzales as Waling Waling
John Wayne Sace as PJ 
Cassandra Ponti as Jack
Bing Pimentel as Mimi
Andrea Concepcion as Mitch
Alvin Patrimonio as Joaquin
Megan Fontanilla Delara as Amber
Clark Daban as Ryker

Footnotes

See also
 List of programs broadcast by ABS-CBN

External links
 

ABS-CBN original programming
2000s teen drama television series
Philippine teen drama television series
2006 Philippine television series debuts
2008 Philippine television series endings
Filipino-language television shows
Television series about teenagers